The Demining Camp is a 2005 documentary directed by Licínio Azevedo. It presents the problems related to land mines left after the Mozambique Civil War and the resulting demining operations.

Festivals
 CINEPORT  - Festival de Cinema de Países de Língua Portuguesa, Brazil (2005)
 IDFA - International Documentary Film Festival Amsterdam, The Netherlands (2005)

Awards
 Best documentary at the 3rd WECC - World Environmental Education Congress, Italy (2005)
 2nd prize "Windows on the World" at the Festival di Cinema Africano, Asia e America Latina, Italy (2005)
  Best documentary of Cinemambiente, Italy (2005)

External links
The Demining Camp - IMDb page about The Demining Camp
Minas terrestres afectam 800 mil pessoas (Article in Portuguese)

Mozambican documentary films
2005 films
2005 documentary films
Documentary films about war
Land mines
Films directed by Licínio Azevedo
Mozambican Civil War
Films shot in Mozambique
Films set in Mozambique